Otto Bäurle (February 3, 1887 – April 26, 1951) was a German track and field athlete, born in Munich, who competed in the 1912 Summer Olympics. In 1912 he finished 14th in the triple jump competition. He also participated in the pentathlon event but retired after three events.

References

External links
list of German athletes

1887 births
1951 deaths
Sportspeople from Munich
German male triple jumpers
German pentathletes
Olympic athletes of Germany
Athletes (track and field) at the 1912 Summer Olympics